Agyneta obscura is a species of sheet weaver found in Congo and Tanzania. It was described by Jacques Denis in 1950.

References

obscura
Spiders of Africa
Spiders described in 1950